Eli's Orange World is a large orange-shaped fruit stand and gift shop in Kissimmee, Florida, United States, located along U.S. Route 192.

History
Eli Sfassie moved from Indiana to Florida to open a Texaco gas station near Walt Disney World when the park opened in 1971. To further capitalize off tourists in the area, Sfassie began selling souvenirs in the service bay. In 1988, he had the building converted to resemble an orange fruit for $6,000.

Currently, the gift shop sells fresh citrus fruits and juice at the fruit stand at the entrance and sells souvenirs as well as snacks and food such as citrus candies, alligator jerky, marmalades, and jellies on the inside.

References

Buildings and structures in Kissimmee, Florida
1988 establishments in Florida